Reinhard Nowak (born 28 April 1964) is an Austrian actor. He appeared in more than sixty films since 1985.

Selected filmography

References

External links 

1964 births
Living people
Austrian male film actors